Keltren is a municipality in the district of Enz in Baden-Württemberg in Germany.

History
The oldest documentary records for the constituent towns of Keltern are from 827 or 830 for Dietenhausen, 919 for Ellmendingen, sometime in the 11th century for Dietlingen, 1219 for Weiler, and around 1300 for Niebelsbach.

The towns of Dietenhausen, Dietlingen, Ellmendingen, and Weiler were for most of their history part of Baden. They were assigned to Pforzheim's jurisdiction in 1803 when the state became the Grand Duchy of Baden. Niebelsbach was ceded on 17 October 1806 to the Kingdom of Württemberg, under whom it was assigned to  until 1 October 1938, when it was reassigned to Calw. Dietenhausen was incorporated into Ellemendingen on 1 July 1971.

On 30 March 1972, all five townships were joined to form the municipality of Keltern, which  the Enz district on 1 January 1973.

Geography
Keltern's primary watercourse is the Pfinz river, whose eastern tributaries flow in a rift parallel to the Upper Rhine Plain. The lowest elevation in the municipality,  normalnull (NN), is along the Pfinz at the border with Remchingen while the highest elevation,  NN, is found in the east.

Coat of arms
Keltern's coat of arms was approved by the Federal Ministry of the Interior on 11 July 1973 and generally recalls the viticulture practiced in the municipal area since the 15th century. It is divided into three portions by a black  that makes up the roof of its lowermost image, a wine press rendered in black and gold. The left section is silver and contains a cluster of blue grapes and the right section is blue and contains a white goblet. The wine press represents those of Dietlingen and Ellmendingen.

Sports
Keltern's Speiterlinghalle is home to the Rutronik Stars Keltern, 2018 and 2021 champion of the 1. Damen-Basketball-Bundesliga.

External links
 Official website (in German)

References

Enzkreis